Fundly is a crowdfunding site for online fundraising. It allows non-profits, charities, politics, clubs, schools, teams, churches, and other causes to raise money online from friends, family, colleagues, donors, and other supporters via email, Facebook, Twitter, LinkedIn, Google, and social media networks. It is also an app for social networks like Facebook and LinkedIn. It uses WePay to process donations.  Donors are charged when they make a donation. Other sites like Fundly  include GoGetFunding, Indiegogo and Kickstarter.

The CEO of the company is Dennis Hu.  In 2011, Fundly obtained $2 million in seed funding using the on-line investor marketplace, AngelList.

Notable projects
A Very Jersey Xmas is a 2012 fund raiser sponsored by New Jersey natives living in the San Francisco Bay Area for relief of victims of Hurricane Sandy.  Donors are invited to parties where they dress up as their favorite Jersey character.
Meg Whitman used Fundly to raise $20 million for her campaign for governor of California.

Pricing
Fundly charges fees based on the scale of the fundraiser.  Individual campaigns are charged 4.9% of the funds collected, plus 3% credit card fees.  Campaigns that reach certain donation levels receive discounts on the fee percentage that Fundly charges. Campaign donations raised from $50,001 to $500,000 are charged 4.4%, donations raised from $500,001 to $1,000,000 are charged 3.9% and every donation raised over $1,000,000 is charged 2.9%

Patents
Fundly has a patent pending on its fund raising technology.

See also 
Crowdfunding
Causes (company)
Comparison of crowd funding services

Be Aware of email "spoofs" and scams which use the FUNDLY name.

References

External links

Crowdfunding platforms of the United States
Companies based in Silicon Valley
2009 establishments in California